Sir John Yonge, 1st Baronet (2 October 1603 – 26 August 1663) of Great House in the parish of Colyton in Devon, was an English politician who sat in the House of Commons variously between 1642 and 1660.

Yonge was the son of Walter Yonge of Colyton and his wife Jane Peryan, daughter of Sir John Peryan. Yonge was a well established merchant and was knighted on 15 September 1625.

In 1642 Yonge was elected Member of Parliament for Plymouth, joining his father (who was already MP for Honiton) in the House of Commons. In December 1648 he was one of the members excluded in Pride's Purge, but returned in the Parliaments of the Protectorate, sitting for Honiton in 1654 and Devon in 1656. In 1660, he was again chosen MP for Honiton in the Convention Parliament.

After the Restoration, Yonge was created a baronet of Culliton on 26 September 1661. He died two years later at the age of 59.

Yonge married Elizabeth Strode and had two sons and a daughter. His son Walter succeeded to the baronetcy.

References

1603 births
1663 deaths
Baronets in the Baronetage of England
Members of the Parliament of England (pre-1707) for Devon
English MPs 1640–1648
English MPs 1654–1655
English MPs 1656–1658
English MPs 1660
Members of the Parliament of England for Plymouth
Members of the Parliament of England (pre-1707) for Honiton